The Église Saint-Polycarpe (Church of St. Polycarp) is a Roman Catholic church located in the 1st arrondissement of Lyon, on the slopes of La Croix-Rousse, between rue René Leynaud, rue Burdeau and passages Mermet and Thiaffait. It is the oldest church of the Oratory of Saint Philip Neri.

History
The church, built by the Oratorians installed on the slopes, was completed in 1670, with the exception of the façade that was built in 1756 by architect Toussaint Loyer who also lengthened the nave.

On 19 June 1791, the Oratory Church became a parish church and took the name of St. Polycarp, as a tribute to Polycarp of Smyrna, master of Saint Pothinus and Irenaeus, who were the first two bishops of Lyon.

The heart of Pauline-Marie Jaricot, founder of the Society for the Propagation of the Faith, currently remains in a chapel of the church.

The church has a famous organ, built by Augustine Zeiger in 1841. Adrien Rougier was the titular organist of the church from 1932 to 1945.

In 1982, the church was classified as monument historique.

Architecture
The church has a facade decorated with four Corinthian pilasters topped by a triangular pediment. Louis Janmot made the painting depicting the Last Supper which is placed in the apse.

Photos

References

Roman Catholic churches completed in 1670
17th-century Roman Catholic church buildings in France
1st arrondissement of Lyon
Roman Catholic churches in Lyon
Monuments historiques of Lyon
1670 establishments in France